Geoff Masters and Pam Teeguarden were the defending champions but lost in the quarterfinals to Alex Metreveli and Olga Morozova.

Dick Stockton and Rosemary Casals won in the final 6‐3, 6‐7, 6‐3 against Fred Stolle and Billie Jean King.

Seeds

Draw

Finals

Top half

Bottom half

References

External links
1975 US Open – Doubles draws and results at the International Tennis Federation

Mixed Doubles
US Open (tennis) by year – Mixed doubles